Elections for Ipswich Borough Council were held on 4 May 2000. One third of the council was up for election and the Labour Party kept overall control of the council.

After the election, the composition of the council was:
Labour 31
Conservative 15
Liberal Democrat 2

Election result

Ward results

Bixley

Bridge

Broom Hill

Castle Hill

References
2000 Ipswich election result
 Ipswich Borough Council Election Results 1973-2012

2000 English local elections
2000
20th century in Suffolk